Micromorphe is a genus of tussock moths in the family Erebidae. The genus was erected by Felder in 1874.

Species

Micromorphe barbarapolonica (Schintlmeister, 1994) Sumatra
Micromorphe chalcostoma (Collenette, 1932) Peninsular Malaysia, Sumatra, Borneo
Micromorphe choerotricha Felder, 1874 Moluccas
Micromorphe hemibathoides (Strand, 1918) Borneo, Sumatra, Peninsular Malaysia
Micromorphe linta (Moore, [1860]) Sundaland
Micromorphe oculata (Toxopeus, 1948) Borneo

References

Lymantriinae
Noctuoidea genera